Daniel Drescher (born 7 October 1989) is an Austrian professional footballer who plays for TWL Elektra and is noted for his tackling abilities and aerial prowess.

Club statistics

Updated to games played as of 16 June 2014.

References

1989 births
Living people
Footballers from Vienna
Austrian footballers
Association football defenders
Austrian Football Bundesliga players
FC Admira Wacker Mödling players
Wolfsberger AC players
SKN St. Pölten players
Austrian Regionalliga players
Austria youth international footballers